Pirdop is a town located in South-West Bulgaria in Pirdop Municipality of Sofia Province in the southeastern part of the Zlatitsa - Pirdop Valley at 670 m above sea level. It is surrounded by the Balkan Range (also known as the Stara Planina) to the north, Sredna Gora Mountain to the south, and Koznitsa and Galabets saddles to the east and west, respectively. The town has a population of 8,040.

Some Aromanians live in Pirdop.

Economy 

The main economic activity is non-ferrous metallurgy. The Pirdop copper smelter and refinery is the biggest in the Balkans and whole of South-Eastern Europe. It was privatized in 1997 for $80,000,000 and is now owned by the German Aurubis. It has a capacity of 160,000 tons and additional capacity of 180,000 tons worth €82,000,000 is being built. The factory also produces  830,000 tons  of sulphuric acid and employs 1,420 workers. The main chimney of the factory is 325 metres tall and shares together with the chimneys of Maritza East Power Stations the title of tallest man-made objects of Bulgaria.

Honour
Pirdop Gate on Livingston Island in the South Shetland Islands, Antarctica is named after Pirdop.

Notes

Gallery

External links
My Bulgaria - Pirdop Valley
Virtual Bulgaria - Southwestern Bulgaria

Towns in Bulgaria
Populated places in Sofia Province
Aromanian settlements in Bulgaria